Colin Sleep (born 8 October 1944) is a former Australian rules footballer who played with Fitzroy in the Victorian Football League (VFL) during the 1960s.

Football

Fitzroy (VFL)
From Horsham originally, Sleep played his football mostly as a rover and centreman. 

He played five times for Fitzroy in 1962, his first season, followed by six in both 1963 and 1964. Four of his five career goals came in a match against North Melbourne at Brunswick Street in his final year.

On 6 July 1963, playing on the wing, he was a member of the young and inexperienced Fitzroy team that comprehensively and unexpectedly defeated Geelong, 9.13 (67) to 3.13 (31) in the 1963 Miracle Match.

Northcote (VFA)
While playing for Northcote in the Victorian Football Association, Sleep represented the Association in the 1966 Hobart Carnival.

In 1967, he tied on votes for the Division 2 Best and Fairest (later known as the Field Medal) but lost on countback; he was later retrospectively made joint winner of the award.

See also
 1963 Miracle Match

Notes

1944 births
Fitzroy Football Club players
Northcote Football Club players
Living people
Australian rules footballers from Victoria (Australia)
Horsham Football Club players